Graham Guy (born 15 August 1983) is a Scottish former professional footballer who played as a defender. He made 133 appearances in the Scottish League, including appearing in the First Division for St Mirren.

References

External links

1983 births
Living people
Scottish footballers
Association football defenders
St Mirren F.C. players
Stranraer F.C. players
Cowdenbeath F.C. players
East Fife F.C. players
Berwick Rangers F.C. players
Scottish Football League players